Samper is a surname. Notable people with the surname include:

 Bernardo Samper, a Colombian squash player 
 Cristián Samper, a Colombian-American biologist and museum administrator
 Juan Felipe Samper, a Colombian musician
 Ernesto Samper, a Colombian politician
 Daniel Samper Pizano, a Colombian lawyer and writer, brother of Ernesto Samper
Daniel Samper Ospina, a Colombian comedian and journalist, son of Daniel Samper Pizano
 Ricardo Samper, a Spanish political figure during the Second Spanish Republic
 Sergi Samper, a Spanish football player